Heterochaerus is a genus of worms belonging to the family Convolutidae.

The species of this genus are found in Australia and Central America.

Species:

Heterochaerus australis 
Heterochaerus blumi 
Heterochaerus carvalhoi 
Heterochaerus langerhansi 
Heterochaerus sargassi

References

Acoelomorphs
Taxa named by William Aitcheson Haswell